Ram Naresh Ram (16 August 1924 – 26 October 2010); popularly known as Parasji, was a member of Bihar Legislative Assembly between 1995 and 2010, representing Sahar Assembly constituency from CPI-ML Liberation party.

Political career
Ram Naresh Ram joined in the Communist Party of India in 1951. After the fraction he joined in CPI (M). In 1967, he became the CPI(M) candidate in the Bihar Assembly elections. He participated in the Naxal movement in Ekwari region, and is considered one  of the leader of 1970 Bhojpur uprising along with Subrata Dutta and others.

References 

1924 births
2010 deaths
Bihari politicians
Bihar MLAs 1995–2000
Bihar MLAs 2000–2005
Bihar MLAs 2005–2010
Communist Party of India (Marxist–Leninist) Liberation politicians